

Current program

Men's

Flyweight
1904: up to 105 lb (47.6 kg)
1920–1936: up to 112 lb (50.8 kg)
1948–1964: up to 51 kg
1968–2008: 48–51 kg
2012–present: 49–52 kg

Notes

Featherweight
1904: 115–125 lb (52.2–56.7 kg)
1908: 116–126 lb (52.6–57.2 kg)
1920–1928: 118–126 lb (53.5–57.2 kg)
1932–1936: 119–126 lb (54.0–57.2 kg)
1948: 54–58 kg
1952–2008: 54–57 kg

Lightweight
1904: 125–135 lb (56.7–61.2 kg)
1908: 126–140 lb (57.2–63.5 kg)
1920–1936: 126–135 lb (57.2–61.2 kg)
1948: 58–62 kg
1952–2008: 57–60 kg
2012–present: 56–60 kg

Welterweight
1904: 135–145 lb (61.2–65.8 kg)
1920–1936: 135–147 lb (61.2–66.7 kg)
1948: 62–67 kg
1952–2000: 63.5–67 kg
2004–present: 64–69 kg

Middleweight
1904: 145–158 lb (65.8–71.7 kg)
1908: 140–158 lb (63.5–71.7 kg)
1920–1936: 147–160 lb (66.7–72.6 kg)
1948: 67–73 kg
1952–2000: 71–75 kg
2004–present: 69–75 kg

Heavyweight
1904–1908: over 158 lb (71.7 kg)
1920–1936: over 175 lb (79.4 kg)
1948: over 80 kg
1952–1980: over 81 kg
1984–present: 81–91 kg

Super heavyweight
1984–present: over 91 kg

Women's

Flyweight

Bantamweight

Featherweight

Lightweight

Welterweight

Middleweight

Discontinued events

Men's

Light flyweight
1968–2008: up to 48 kg.
2012–2016: up to 49 kg.

Bantamweight
1904: 105–115 lb (47.6–52.2 kg)
1908: up to 116 lb (52.6 kg)
1920–1928: 112–118 lb (50.8–53.5 kg)
1932–1936: 112–119 lb (50.8–54.0 kg)
1948–2008: 51–54 kg
2012–2016: 52–56 kg

Light welterweight
1952–2000: 60–63.5 kg
2004–2016: 60–64 kg

Light middleweight
1952–2000: 67–71 kg

Light heavyweight
1920–1936: 160–175 lb (72.6–79.4 kg)
1948: 73–80 kg
1952–2020: 75–81 kg

Multiple medalists
Boxers who have won 3 or more Olympic medals. Western athletes usually participate in a single Olympic tournament and then turn pro, while boxers from Cuba and other countries with state support of the sport might compete in several Olympics, therefore having a clear advantage in terms of age and experience. Therefore, there are no representatives of the United States, the most medaled boxing nation, on the list.

As of the 2016 Summer Olympics

References

 International Olympic Committee results database

Boxing
medalists
Olympic medalists